Edward Hale (born 1 September 1764 at Hambledon, Hampshire; died 16 November 1823 at Hambledon) was an English amateur cricketer who made 3 known appearances in first-class cricket matches from 1789 to 1797.

Career
He was mainly associated with Hampshire.

References

External sources
 CricketArchive record

1764 births
1823 deaths
English cricketers
English cricketers of 1787 to 1825
Hampshire cricketers
Hambledon cricketers